Mireh va Ahmad (also Romanized as Mīreh va Āḥmad; also known as Posht Tang-e ‘Olyā) is a village in Tarhan-e Sharqi Rural District, Tarhan District, Kuhdasht County, Lorestan Province, Iran. At the 2006 census, its population was 375, in 71 families.

References 

Towns and villages in Kuhdasht County